("Children's Games") Op. 22, is a suite of twelve miniatures composed by Georges Bizet for piano four hands in 1871. The entire piece has a duration of about 20 to 23 minutes.

Structure 
The movement titles are as follows:

  – reverie (The swing)
  – impromptu (The spinning top)
  – berceuse (The doll)
  – scherzo (Wooden horses)
  – fantasie (Battledore and shuttlecock)
  – marche (Trumpet and drum)
  – rondino (Soap bubbles)
  – esquisse (Puss in the corner)
  – nocturne (Blind man's buff)
  – caprice (Leap-frog)
  – duo (Little husband, little wife)
  – galop (The ball)

Originally there were ten numbers, with the seventh and eighth added after the first group;  is adapted from a march at the start of act 5 of his opera Ivan IV. Bizet sold the work in both piano and orchestra form to Durand in September 1871 for 600 francs.
Bizet's biographer Winton Dean considers it to be a forerunner of similar childhood-related works by Debussy, Fauré and Ravel. He goes to comment that each "evokes a facet of childhood, but there is not a trace of triviality, self-consciousness or false sentiment". Harman and Mellers argue that, with the music Bizet wrote for the stage production of L'Arlésienne, the Jeux d'Enfants represents the rediscovery of his true musical nature, exploring his melodic gifts, while the concentrated form of short pieces allowed him to discover chromatic and enharmonic subtleties both "simple and single-minded", in contrast with the more romantic nostalgia of Schumann in his childhood pieces.

Orchestration 
Bizet orchestrated six of these; in addition to No. 8, Nos. 6, 3, 2, 11, 12 became his Petite Suite; it is probable he also orchestrated No. 4. The remaining movements were later orchestrated by Roy Douglas (5 numbers) and Hershy Kay (2 numbers) and a complete orchestral suite has been recorded as Jeux d'enfants.

Bizet's version of No. 8, which contains an additional 48-bar section has been recorded by Michel Plasson, while the standard suite has been recorded many times.

Adaptations 
Sigfrid Karg-Elert wrote his orchestral suite after Bizet's Jeux d'enfants, Op. 21, in 1902.

In 1932, Léonide Massine choreographed the entire suite as the ballet . Libretto by Boris Kochno, scenography by Joan Miró (Ballet Russe de Monte-Carlo, first performed at the Opéra de Monte-Carlo).

In 1955, George Balanchine choreographed the suite as the ballet Jeux d'enfants. In 1975 he made a new ballet, The Steadfast Tin Soldier, using only four of the movements.

References

External links

, Alexander Lonquich and Cristina Barbuti

Compositions for piano four-hands
Compositions by Georges Bizet
1871 compositions
Suites (music)
Orchestral suites